Aisin-Gioro Mianqin (1768 – 1820) was Qing dynasty imperial prince and Qianlong Emperor's grandson.

Life 
Mianqin was born as the eldest son of Yongxing and his primary consort, lady Fuca, niece of Empress Xiaoxianchun (daughter of empress' youngest brother, Fuheng). 

Initially Mianqin held a title of lesser bulwark duke.  In 1796, his second son Yilun, was adopted into Prince Lü peerage due to childlessness of Yongcheng's son, Mianhui. In 1802, he was promoted to beile.  He became an only heir apparent of the Prince Cheng peerage, because his brothers Miansi and Mianyi were adopted by childless imperial princes, such as Yongzhang or Yongji.  His mother died in November 1813.

Mianqin was posthumously granted a title of Prince Cheng of the Second Rank in 1820. He was succeeded by his eldest son, Yishou.

Family 

 Primary consort, of the Wumi clan (嫡福晋 乌密氏)
 Prince Cheng of the Second Rank Yishou (成郡王 奕绶), first son
Seventh son
 Secondary consort, of the Zhaojia clan (侧福晋 赵佳氏)
 Third son
 Yiwei (1794-1797)
 Yisheng (奕绳), sixth son
 First Class Bulwark General Yiru (一等辅国将军 奕儒; 1809-1845), eighth son
 Secondary consort, of the Wanyan clan (侧福晋 汪佳氏)
 Yixu (奕续；1820-1854), eleventh son
 Mistress, of the Li clan (妾 李氏)
 Grace General Yichuo (奉恩将军 奕绰;1818-1863), ninth son
 Yibian (奕编, 1820-1821), tenth son
 Mistress, of the Zhao clan (妾 赵氏)
 Prince of the Third Rank Yilun (贝勒 奕伦;1790-1836), second son adopted into Prince Lü peerage by Mianhui
 Fourth Rank Official Yifan (奕繁;1795-1820), fifth son

References 

Manchu people 
Qing dynasty imperial princes 
Prince Cheng